Olivera is the female version of Oliver, with Oliveras also a Catalan surname. Notable people with the surname include:

Alfredo Olivera (1908-?), Uruguayan chess master
Baldomero Olivera (born 1938), Filipino chemist
Benjamin Oliveras (born 1981), French football player
Érika Olivera (born 1976), Chilean marathon runner
Fernando Olivera (born 1958), Peruvian politician
Héctor Olivera (film director) (born 1931), Argentine film director, producer and screenplay writer
Joaquín Enrique Valerio Olivera (born 1973), Spanish football player
Juan Manuel Olivera (born 1981), Uruguayan football player
Mako Oliveras (born 1946), Puerto Rican baseball player and manager
Nicolás Olivera (born 1978), Uruguayan football player
Rubén Olivera (born 1983), Uruguayan football player

See also
Estadio Atilio Paiva Olivera, stadium in Rivera, Uruguay
Olvera (disambiguation)
Oliveria (disambiguation)
Oliveira (surname)